The 1995 NASCAR Busch Series was held February 18 and ended November 5. Johnny Benson of BACE Motorsports won the championship.

This was the first season to utilize V8 engines after having used V6 engines since the series began in 1982.

Teams and drivers

Complete schedule

Limited schedule

Races

Goody's 300 

The Goody's 300 was held February 18 at Daytona International Speedway. Michael Waltrip won the pole.

Top ten results

23-Chad Little
30-Michael Waltrip
14-Terry Labonte
8-Kenny Wallace
54-Rich Bickle
51-Jim Bown
3-Jeff Green
60-Mark Martin
4-Jeff Purvis
74-Johnny Benson
This was Little's first career Busch Series victory.

Goodwrench 200 

The Goodwrench 200 was held February 25 at North Carolina Speedway. David Green won the pole.

Top ten results

23-Chad Little
60-Mark Martin
14-Terry Labonte
74-Johnny Benson
21-Morgan Shepherd
99-Phil Parsons
82-Derrike Cope
90-Mike Wallace
97-Joe Bessey
3-Jeff Green

Hardee's 250 

The Hardee's 250 was held March 4 at Richmond International Raceway. Chad Little won the pole.

Top ten results

8-Kenny Wallace
14-Terry Labonte
74-Johnny Benson
34-Mike McLaughlin
57-Jason Keller
7-Stevie Reeves
6-Tommy Houston
08-Bobby Dotter
99-Phil Parsons
48-Randy Porter

Busch Light 300 

The Busch Light 300 was held March 11 at Atlanta Motor Speedway. Mark Martin won the pole.

Top ten results

74-Johnny Benson
52-Ken Schrader
51-Jim Bown
55-Tim Fedewa
1-Hermie Sadler
43-Rodney Combs
92-Larry Pearson
82-Derrike Cope
75-Rick Wilson
38-Elton Sawyer

Opryland USA 320 

The Opryland USA 320 was held March 17 at Nashville Speedway USA. Darrell Waltrip won the pole.

Top ten results

44-David Green
23-Chad Little
14-Terry Labonte
8-Kenny Wallace
92-Larry Pearson
74-Johnny Benson
34-Mike McLaughlin
11-Darrell Waltrip
17-Robbie Reiser
3-Jeff Green

Mark III Vans 200 

The Mark III Vans 200 was held March 25 at Darlington Raceway. Tim Fedewa won the pole.

Top ten results

92-Larry Pearson
74-Johnny Benson
60-Mark Martin
23-Chad Little
99-Phil Parsons
29-Steve Grissom
87-Joe Nemechek
20-Bobby Hillin Jr.
71-Kevin Lepage
57-Jason Keller

Goody's 250 

The Goody's 250 was held April 1 at Bristol Motor Speedway. David Green won the pole.

Top ten results

29-Steve Grissom
60-Mark Martin
23-Chad Little
8-Kenny Wallace
14-Terry Labonte
74-Johnny Benson
5-Brad Teague
90-Mike Wallace
63-Curtis Markham
57-Jason Keller

Sundrop 400 

The Sundrop 400 was held April 15 at Hickory Motor Speedway. David Green won the pole.

Top ten results

74-Johnny Benson
1-Hermie Sadler
34-Mike McLaughlin
57-Jason Keller
08-Bobby Dotter
59-Dennis Setzer
47-Jeff Fuller
63-Curtis Markham
51-Jim Bown
11-Pete Silva
This was Benson's last career NASCAR Busch Series victory.

NE Chevy Dealers 250 

The NE Chevy Dealers 250 was held May 13 at New Hampshire International Speedway. Mike McLaughlin won the pole.

Top ten results

23-Chad Little
38-Elton Sawyer
90-Mike Wallace
34-Mike McLaughlin
74-Johnny Benson
59-Dennis Setzer
25-Johnny Rumley
72-Tracy Leslie
76-Tom Bolles
92-Larry Pearson

Meridian Advantage 200 

The Meridian Advantage 200 was held May 21 at Nazareth Speedway. David Green won the pole.

Top ten results

55-Tim Fedewa
35-Doug Heveron
74-Johnny Benson
3-Jeff Green
44-David Green
08-Bobby Dotter
57-Jason Keller
38-Elton Sawyer
47-Jeff Fuller
20-Joe Bessey
This was Fedewa's first career Busch Series victory.

Red Dog 300 

The Red Dog 300 was held May 27 at Charlotte Motor Speedway. Rich Bickle won the pole.

Top ten results

23-Chad Little
3-Jeff Green
72-Tracy Leslie
60-Mark Martin
52-Ken Schrader
57-Jason Keller
14-Terry Labonte
54-Rich Bickle
4-Jeff Purvis
71-Kevin Lepage

GM Goodwrench/Delco 200 

The GM Goodwrench/Delco 200 was held June 3 at Dover International Speedway. Tracy Leslie won the pole.

Top ten results

34-Mike McLaughlin
90-Mike Wallace
2-Ricky Craven
57-Jason Keller
32-Dale Jarrett
25-Johnny Rumley
99-Phil Parsons
1-Hermie Sadler
23-Chad Little
20-Jimmy Spencer

Carolina Pride/Red Dog 250 

The Carolina Pride/Red Dog 250 was held June 10 at Myrtle Beach Speedway. Jeff Green won the pole.

Top ten results

92-Larry Pearson
57-Jason Keller
59-Dennis Setzer
3-Jeff Green
08-Bobby Dotter
43-Rodney Combs
63-Curtis Markham
34-Mike McLaughlin
74-Johnny Benson
38-Elton Sawyer

Lysol 200 

The Lysol 200 was held June 25 at Watkins Glen International. Terry Labonte won the pole.

Top ten results

14-Terry Labonte
23-Chad Little
2-Ricky Craven
34-Mike McLaughlin
3-Jeff Green
29-Steve Grissom
74-Johnny Benson
63-Curtis Markham
1-Hermie Sadler
29-Phil Parsons

Sears Auto Center 250 

The Sears Auto Center 250 was held July 2 at The Milwaukee Mile. Dennis Setzer won the pole.

Top ten results

32-Dale Jarrett
92-Larry Pearson
3-Jeff Green
59-Dennis Setzer
34-Mike McLaughlin
57-Jason Keller
63-Curtis Markham
23-Chad Little
90-Mike Wallace
54-Rich Bickle

Humminbird Fishfinder 500K 

The Humminbird Fishfinder 500K was held July 22 at Talladega Superspeedway. Jeff Purvis won the pole.

Top ten results

23-Chad Little
20-Jimmy Spencer
8-Kenny Wallace
87-Joe Nemechek
74-Johnny Benson
90-Mike Wallace
40-Patty Moise
75-Rick Wilson
52-Ken Schrader
38-Elton Sawyer

Ford Credit 300 

The Ford Credit 300 was held July 29 at South Boston Speedway. Curtis Markham won the pole.

Top ten results

23-Chad Little
34-Mike McLaughlin
44-David Green
92-Larry Pearson
95-Ward Burton
64-Bobby Dotter
38-Elton Sawyer
46-Elliott Sadler
00-Buckshot Jones
71-Kevin Lepage

Kroger 200 

The Kroger 200 was held August 4 at Indianapolis Raceway Park. Elton Sawyer won the pole.

Top ten results

57-Jason Keller
38-Elton Sawyer
34-Mike McLaughlin
72-Tracy Leslie
6-Tommy Houston
1-Hermie Sadler
08-Bobby Dotter
95-Ward Burton
3-Jeff Green
47-Jeff Fuller

Chris Diamond spun around in turn two and knocked the lights at the exact place where Gary St. Amant did the previous day in the SuperTruck Series.

Detroit Gasket 200 

The Detroit Gasket 200 was held August 19 at Michigan International Speedway. Dale Jarrett won the pole. Jarrett had led the most laps in the race and won, but was disqualified for a rules violation, giving the win to Mark Martin.

Top ten results

60-Mark Martin
14-Terry Labonte
64-Randy LaJoie
2-Ricky Craven
74-Johnny Benson
99-Phil Parsons
20-Jimmy Spencer
2-Ward Burton
52-Ken Schrader
34-Mike McLaughlin

This race was Tommy Ellis' last career start.

Food City 250 

The Food City 250 was held August 25 at Bristol Motor Speedway. Stevie Reeves won the pole.

Top ten results

29-Steve Grissom
3-Jeff Green
55-Tim Fedewa
23-Chad Little
14-Terry Labonte
44-David Green
6-Tommy Houston
71-Kevin Lepage
20-Jimmy Spencer
47-Jeff Fuller

Gatorade 200 

The Gatorade 200 was held September 2 at Darlington Raceway. Larry Pearson won the pole.

Top ten results

60-Mark Martin
74-Johnny Benson
95-Ward Burton
99-Phil Parsons
87-Joe Nemechek
90-Mike Wallace
57-Jason Keller
38-Elton Sawyer
3-Jeff Green
34-Mike McLaughlin

Autolite 250 

The Autolite 250 was held September 8 at Richmond International Raceway. Randy LaJoie won the pole.

Top ten results

32-Dale Jarrett
60-Mark Martin
74-Johnny Benson
29-Steve Grissom
14-Terry Labonte
20-Jimmy Spencer
44-David Green
8-Kenny Wallace
64-Randy LaJoie
38-Elton Sawyer

MBNA 200 

The MBNA 200 was held September 16 at Dover International Speedway. Jason Keller won the pole.

Top ten results

25-Johnny Rumley
1-Hermie Sadler
99-Phil Parsons
29-Steve Grissom
90-Mike Wallace
35-Doug Heveron
34-Mike McLaughlin
3-Jeff Green
74-Johnny Benson
43-Rodney Combs

All Pro Bumper to Bumper 300 

The All Pro Bumper to Bumper 300 was held October 7 at Charlotte Motor Speedway. Bobby Dotter won the pole.

Top ten results

60-Mark Martin
32-Dale Jarrett
4-Jeff Purvis
47-Jeff Fuller
34-Mike McLaughlin
21-Morgan Shepherd
92-Larry Pearson
14-Terry Labonte
05-Chuck Bown
8-Kenny Wallace

AC-Delco 200 

The AC-Delco 200 was held October 21 at North Carolina Speedway. Johnny Benson won the pole.

Top ten results

72-Todd Bodine
90-Mike Wallace
74-Johnny Benson
95-Ward Burton
44-David Green
29-Steve Grissom
54-Rich Bickle
60-Mark Martin
64-Randy LaJoie
71-Kevin Lepage

Jiffy Lube Miami 300 

The inaugural Jiffy Lube Miami 300 was held November 5 at the Miami-Dade Homestead Motorsports Complex. Joe Nemechek won the pole.

Top ten results

32-Dale Jarrett
55-Tim Fedewa
57-Jason Keller
30-Michael Waltrip
60-Mark Martin
99-Phil Parsons
87-Joe Nemechek
47-Jeff Fuller
74-Johnny Benson
63-Curtis Markham

Final Busch Grand National Series win for Dale Jarrett.

Final points standings 

Johnny Benson - 3688 
Chad Little - 3284
Mike McLaughlin - 3273
Jason Keller - 3211
Jeff Green - 3182
Larry Pearson - 3029
Tim Fedewa - 3022
Phil Parsons - 2985
Elton Sawyer - 2952
Jeff Fuller - 2845
Rodney Combs - 2782
David Green - 2714
Hermie Sadler - 2694
Bobby Dotter - 2636
Curtis Markham - 2584
Tracy Leslie - 2530
Terry Labonte - 2490
Kevin Lepage - 2355
Doug Heveron - 2326
Mike Wallace - 2295
Tommy Houston - 2069
Mark Martin - 2037
Dennis Setzer - 2036
Jim Bown - 2026
Patty Moise - 1901
Steve Grissom - 1816
Kenny Wallace - 1814
Johnny Rumley - 1708
Stevie Reeves - 1454 
Robbie Reiser - 1444
Ward Burton - 1389
Dale Jarrett - 1376
Rich Bickle - 1220
Jimmy Spencer - 1177
Rick Wilson - 1173
Dirk Stephens - 1030
Randy LaJoie - 1029
Jeff Purvis - 999
Randy Porter - 994
Ken Schrader - 984
Buckshot Jones - 833
Joe Nemechek - 783
Ricky Craven - 761
Joe Bessey - 733
Morgan Shepherd - 715
Bobby Hillin Jr. - 616
Ed Berrier - 596
Michael Waltrip - 595
Kirk Shelmerdine - 562
Jeremy Mayfield - 535

Full Drivers' Championship

(key) Bold – Pole position awarded by time. Italics – Pole position set by owner's points. * – Most laps led.

Rookie of the Year 
Jeff Fuller, driving for the first-year ST Motorsports was named the 1995 Busch Series Rookie of the Year, finishing in the top-ten six times. His closest runner-up was Curtis Markham, who finished 15th in the final standings. Buckshot Jones and David Bonnett were the only two contenders that season, both of whom ran limited schedules that season.

See also 
1994–95 NASCAR SuperTruck Series exhibition races
1995 NASCAR Winston Cup Series
1995 NASCAR SuperTruck Series

References

External links 
 Busch Series standings and statistics for 1995

NASCAR Xfinity Series seasons